Hind Motor railway station is a small railway station in Hooghly district, West Bengal. Its code is HMZ. It serves Hind Motor area.

References 

Howrah railway division
Railway stations in Hooghly district
Kolkata Suburban Railway stations